Blast of Storm (foaled 1996 in Ireland) was a Barbadian Thoroughbred racehorse who was the first horse to win three consecutive runnings of the Barbados Gold Cup. 

Trained by William C. Marshall for owner Lady Sally Arbib, Blast of storm was ridden by Jono Jones in all three of his Gold Cup wins.

Retired from racing, Blast of storm entered stud in Barbados in 2003.

A life-size bronze statue of Blast of Storm now graces the infield opposite the finishing line.

Pedigree

References
  Blast of Storm's pedigree and partial racing stats

1996 racehorse births
Thoroughbred family 3-l
Racehorses bred in Ireland
Racehorses trained in Barbados
Barbadian racehorses